Koodaranji  is a Town in Kozhikode district in the state of Kerala, India.

Demographics
 India census, Koodaranji had a population of 17782 with 8977 males and 8805 females.

References

Cities and towns in Kozhikode district